Bagh-e Fakhruiyeh (also Romanized as Bāgh-e Fakhrū’īyeh, Bāgh Fakhrū’īyeh, and Bāgh Fakhrūyeh) is a village in Bezenjan Rural District, in the Central District of Baft County, Kerman Province, Iran. At the 2006 census, its population was 292, in 60 families.

References 

Populated places in Baft County